During the 1940–41 season Hearts competed in the Southern League, the Summer Cup, the Southern League Cup and the East of Scotland Shield.

Fixtures

Wilson Cup

Rosebery Charity Cup

Southern League Cup

Summer Cup

Southern League

See also
List of Heart of Midlothian F.C. seasons

References

Statistical Record 40-41

External links
Official Club website

Heart of Midlothian F.C. seasons
Heart of Midlothian